Sheldon Clark (August 29, 1876 – August 15, 1952) was Commodore of the Chicago Yacht Club (for which he held "Membership #1"), civic leader, and chairman of the Sinclair Refining Company. A lifelong yachtsman, he sailed in the America's Cup races with Sir Thomas Lipton and in many Chicago-to-Mackinac races.  He was a judge in the Long Count Fight at Soldier Field in Chicago in 1927.

In 1927, he was charged with jury-fixing in the Fall-Sinclair oil conspiracy trial. However, he was absolved of all charges.  In 1929, he was elected president of the Chicago Stadium Corporation. He was involved in Republican politics (and was frequently urged to run for Governor of Illinois), the Boy Scouts of America, and the Navy League of the United States. He was elected president of the Navy League in 1940. He died on August 15, 1952.

References

1876 births
1952 deaths
Sinclair Oil Corporation